Mystic Lake Casino Hotel is owned and operated by the Shakopee Mdewakanton Sioux Community (SMSC) in Prior Lake, Minnesota, United States, southwest of Minneapolis and Saint Paul.  With 4,100 employees, the SMSC – including Mystic Lake Casino Hotel and Little Six Casino – is the largest employer in Scott County. The casino's gambling options include slots, bingo, video roulette, pulltabs, and live dealer blackjack. Mystic Lake also offers bars, restaurants, shows, special events, and accommodations.

History 

Mystic Lake Casino Hotel is owned and operated by the Shakopee Mdewakanton Sioux Community (SMSC), a federally recognized, sovereign Indian tribe.

The SMSC opened Little Six Bingo in 1982, which became Little Six Casino in 1990 following the passage of the federal Indian Gaming Regulatory Act of 1988 and the signing of a gaming compact between the SMSC and the State of Minnesota. The SMSC and other Minnesota tribes were the first in the United States to negotiate and sign tribal-state compacts with a state government related to gaming.

Mystic Lake Casino Hotel opened on May 12, 1992. It is named after the nearby lake of the same name. Its success has helped fund SMSC goals, including economic diversification and improvements to tribal infrastructure and services from the 1990s to the present.

In 2012 the SMSC initiated a 10-year cooperative agreement with Canterbury Park in neighboring Shakopee, Minnesota, to support increased purses for live horse races and joint marketing opportunities between Canterbury Park and Mystic Lake. In 2013, the first full racing season under the agreement, Canterbury Park completed its longest season since 2006, with a purse distribution that was double the amount paid out to the horse owners in 2011.

In 2018 Mystic Lake Center opened, the newest addition to Mystic Lake Casino Hotel.

With 766 hotel rooms, Mystic Lake Casino Hotel is one of the largest hotels in the Twin Cities metro area.

Awards 

The SMSC Gaming Enterprise, which includes Mystic Lake and Little Six, received a "Best Places to Work" award from the Minneapolis-Saint Paul Business Journal in 2012 and 2013, and a "Top 100 Workplaces" award from the Minneapolis Star Tribune in 2013.

References 

Native American casinos
Casinos in Minnesota
Buildings and structures in Scott County, Minnesota
Tourist attractions in Scott County, Minnesota
Casino hotels
Native American history of Minnesota
Shakopee Mdewakanton Sioux Community